The In Beceten Formation, also Beceten or Ibecten is a Coniacian to Santonian geologic formation in the Iullemmeden Basin of Niger. Dinosaur remains are among the fossils that have been recovered from the formation, although none have yet been referred to a specific genus. The lithology primarily consists of clays, fine limestones and sandy clays.

Fossil content 
The following fossils have been reported from the formation:
Fish
 Amia sp.
 Stromerichthys sp.
 Lepisosteidae indet.

Reptiles

 Erymnochelys madagascariensis
 Madtsoia aff. madagascariensis
 Trematochampsa taqueti
 Libycosuchus sp.
 Carnosauria indet.
 Goniopholididae indet. Lacertilia indet.
 Pelomedusidae indet.
 Serpentes indet.
 Titanosaurinae indet.

Amphibians

 Pachycentrata taqueti Ceratodus sp. Protopterus sp.''
 Ranidae indet.
 Urodela indet.

Flora
 Dicotyledonae

See also 
 List of dinosaur-bearing rock formations
 List of stratigraphic units with indeterminate dinosaur fossils
 Lists of fossiliferous stratigraphic units in Africa
 List of fossiliferous stratigraphic units in Niger
 Geology of Niger

References

Bibliography

Further reading 
 F. de Broin, E. Buffetaut, J.-C. Koeniguer, J.-C. Rage, D. E. Russell, P. Taquet, C. Vergnaud-Grazzini and S. Wenz. 1974. La fauna de Vertébrés continentaux du gisement d'In Beceten (Sénonien du Niger) [The continental vertebrate fauna from the In Beceten locality (Senonian of Niger)]. Comptes Rendus Hebdomadaires des Seances de l'Academie des Sciences à Paris, série D 279:469-472

Geologic formations of Niger
Upper Cretaceous Series of Africa
Cretaceous Niger
Coniacian Stage
Santonian Stage
Shale formations
Limestone formations
Sandstone formations
Fluvial deposits
Lacustrine deposits
Paleontology in Niger
Formations